Sohan Singh Dhanoa (born 15 February 1930) is an Indian middle-distance runner. He competed in the 800 metres at the 1952 Summer Olympics and the 1956 Summer Olympics.

References

External links
 

1930 births
Possibly living people
Athletes (track and field) at the 1952 Summer Olympics
Athletes (track and field) at the 1956 Summer Olympics
Indian male middle-distance runners
Olympic athletes of India
Place of birth missing (living people)
Asian Games silver medalists for India
Asian Games medalists in athletics (track and field)
Athletes (track and field) at the 1954 Asian Games
Medalists at the 1954 Asian Games